Brontosaurus is a genus of sauropod dinosaur.

Brontosaurus may also refer to:
9949 Brontosaurus, a main-belt asteroid
Hnutí Brontosaurus, an environmental movement in the Czech Republic
"Brontosaurus" (song), a song by rock group The Move
A 2002 album by Da Vinci's Notebook
Brontosaurus (play), a stage play by Lanford Wilson
Brontosaurus rib, a type of short rib cut taken from beef or a similar animal

See also
Bronto (disambiguation)